Fountain Valley School District is a district of ten schools located in Fountain Valley, California. Former school Fred Moiola Elementary School (a K-8 school) was closed in 2012.

Schools

Elementary schools
Roch Courreges Elementary
James H. Cox Elementary
Robert Gisler Elementary
Isojira Oka Elementary
William T. Newland Elementary 
Urbain H. Plavan Elementary
Hisamatsu Tamura Elementary School

Middle schools
Harry C. Fulton Middle School
Kazuo Masuda Middle School
Samuel E. Talbert Middle School

References

External links
 

School districts in Orange County, California
Fountain Valley, California